The Lester Solus was an English automobile built in Shepherd's Bush, London only in 1913.  A single-seat cyclecar, it ran on an 8 hp JAP or Precision V-twin engine with friction drive and belts to the rear wheels.

See also 
 List of car manufacturers of the United Kingdom

References

Cyclecars
Defunct motor vehicle manufacturers of England
Defunct companies based in London
Vehicle manufacture in London